Kangari (also Romanized as Kangarī) is a village in Hanza Rural District, Hanza District, Rabor County, Kerman Province, Iran. At the 2006 census, its population was 705, in 121 families.

References 

Populated places in Rabor County